Acayo Christine Cwinya also known as Christine Cwinya-Ai Acayo (Born on 31 July 1968)  is a Ugandan politician. She served as the Member of Parliament in the ninth Parliament of Uganda representing Nebbi District. She belongs to the ruling National Resistance Movement political party.

Education 
She comes from Jonam. In 1993, Acayo graduated from Makerere University with a Master's Degree in Education, Planning and Management.

Political journey 
She is the official National Resistance Movement flag bearer for Nebbi District. During her political speech, she urged the need for people to all work together to fight ignorance, poverty and disease in Nebbi other than fighting one another.

See also 
 List of members of the ninth Parliament of Uganda

References

External links 
 morph.io: everypolitician-scrapers/uganda-parliament-scraper
 https://www.acode-u.org/uploadedFiles/PSDA12.pdf
 
 Women Representatives

1968 births
Living people
People from Nebbi District
National Resistance Movement politicians
Members of the Parliament of Uganda
Women members of the Parliament of Uganda
Parliament of Uganda